"Mickey's Monkey" is a 1963 song recorded by the R&B group the Miracles on Motown Records' Tamla label. It was written and produced by Motown's main songwriting team of Brian Holland, Lamont Dozier, and Eddie Holland, who later went on to write two more Miracles hit singles, the Top 40 "I Gotta Dance to Keep From Crying", and the Top 20 "(Come 'Round Here) I'm The One You Need". This was unusual, as most Miracles songs were composed by the group members themselves.

Overview
Described by Miracles lead singer Smokey Robinson as "One of our biggest records ever in life", "Mickey's Monkey" was a Billboard Top 10 Pop smash, reaching #8 on that chart, and a Top 10 R&B hit as well, reaching #3. One of the group's most powerful singles, it was also the Miracles' third million-selling record in as many years, after "Shop Around" (1961) and "You've Really Got A Hold On Me" (1962).

A comical story about "A cat named Mickey from out of town" (William "Mickey" Stevenson) who "spread his new dance all around", the song helped popularize "The Monkey" as a national dance craze in the early 1960s. In the Motown DVD release, Smokey Robinson & The Miracles: The Definitive Performances, Smokey exclaimed that this song began when he spotted Lamont Dozier playing the song's initial chords on the piano at the Motown studios one day. (It has been described by many rock historians as having a beat influenced by the music of Bo Diddley). While playing, Dozier was singing the song's famous chorus: "Lum de lum de lai-ai". Intrigued, Smokey then requested that Lamont record it for The Miracles, at the time Motown's top group, to which Lamont agreed. Recorded in the Motown studios with an intended "live party" feel, the song has Smokey start with the now-famous line: "Alright . . . Is everybody ready ?" followed by the people saying “Yeah!”. In addition to The Miracles' contribution, "Mickey's Monkey" also featured background vocals by Mary Wilson of The Supremes, famed Detroit Dee Jay "Jockey Jack" Gibson, Martha & The Vandellas, and members of The Temptations and The Marvelettes. One of the most famous of the early Motown hits, "Mickey's Monkey" was often used by The Miracles as their closing song on the legendary "Motortown Revue" touring shows in the early 1960s, where it usually "brought the house down".

The recording begins with Smokey Robinson asking: "Alright, is everybody ready?", to which the crowd, in unison, responds enthusiastically "Yes!". This is followed by Smokey saying "Alright now, here we go. A one, a two, a one, two, three, four", before the drum issue in the chorus.

Chart performance

Other versions
This song has inspired later versions by Mother's Finest, Martha & The Vandellas, The Hollies, Lou Christie, Cannibal & the Headhunters,  The Young Rascals, John Cougar Mellencamp and The Supremes.

It was also used in the soundtrack of the award-winning 1964 Ivan Dixon film Nothing But a Man, and the 1998 motion picture Simon Birch. The Miracles can be seen performing "Mickey's Monkey" on The PBS special Red, White, and Rock(on VHS & DVD), the 1985 Sony/Dave Clark Productions/ Picture Music VHS release Ready Steady Go Special Edition: The Sounds of Motown (VHS), and the 2006 Motown/Universal DVD release: Smokey Robinson & The Miracles: The Definitive Performances 1963-1987.They also performed the song before an enthusiastic live audience at the Santa Monica Civic Auditorium in 1964 on the American International Pictures release, The T.A.M.I. Show .  This song has appeared on virtually every Miracles "greatest hits" collection and anthology, except for their Greatest Hits, Vol.2 album and CD.

The song's B-side was "Whatever Makes You Happy", a song that, while not charting nationally, did become a hit on several regional charts, and has inspired a cover version by singer Jacki Gore. It was also the title cut of the 1993 Motown/Rhino CD compilation, Smokey Robinson & The Miracles: Whatever Makes You Happy (More of the Best).

Personnel
The Miracles
 Smokey Robinson — lead vocals
 Claudette Robinson — background vocals
 Bobby Rogers — background vocals
 Pete Moore — background vocals
 Ronnie White — background vocals
 Marv Tarplin — guitar

Additional personnel
 Mary Wilson — background vocals
 Martha Reeves — background vocals
 Rosalind Ashford — background vocals
 Annette Beard — background vocals
 "Jockey Jack" Gibson — background vocals
 The Temptations — background vocals
 The Marvelettes — background vocals
 The Funk Brothers — other instrumentation
 Brian Holland — producer
 Lamont Dozier — producer

References
Hits Of The Sixties: The Million Sellers by Demitri Coryton and Joseph Murrells, p. 82, Batsford Ltd., 1990, 
Motown DVD: Smokey Robinson & The Miracles: The Definitive Performances (1963-1987)
Andrew Hamilton-Allmusic (Mickey's Monkey/Bo Diddley connection)
The Miracles perform "Mickey's Monkey" live- Motortown Revue Vol 2 album and CD;, their 1969 album: Smokey Robinson & The Miracles: LIVE! LP, and the group's final live album; Smokey Robinson & The Miracles: 1957-1972 – these latter two are now available on CD in the Motown/HIP-O Select release,Smokey Robinson & The Miracles: The LIVE Collection.

External links
 Mickeys Monkey-by The Miracles (video)
 Mickey's Monkey - song review from the Soully Oldies website.

The Miracles songs
Tamla Records singles
1963 singles
Songs written by Holland–Dozier–Holland
Song recordings produced by Brian Holland
Song recordings produced by Lamont Dozier
1963 songs
Songs about dancing
Songs about primates